An oscillator is a technical analysis indicator that varies over time within a band (above and below a center line, or between set levels). Oscillators are used to discover short-term overbought or oversold conditions.

Common oscillators are MACD, ROC, RSI, CCI.

See also
 Technical analysis

References
Investopedia - Oscillator
StockCharts.com - Introduction to Technical Indicators and Oscillators

Technical analysis
Technical indicators
Technical  Analysis  and Oscillator Book pdf